Uzi Vishne is Professor of Mathematics at Bar Ilan University, Israel. His main interests are division algebras, Gelfand–Kirillov dimension, Coxeter groups, Artin groups, combinatorial group theory, monomial algebras, and arithmetic of algebraic groups. He's been the dean of Exact Sciences since October 2021.

Selected publications

External links
 http://u.cs.biu.ac.il/~vishne/
 mathematics genealogy project
 Uzi Vishne user page at Hebrew Wikipedia

Israeli mathematicians
Academic staff of Bar-Ilan University
Living people
Group theorists
Year of birth missing (living people)